Clarendon is an unincorporated community in Columbus County, North Carolina, United States. Clarendon has a post office with ZIP code 28432.

References

Unincorporated communities in Columbus County, North Carolina
Unincorporated communities in North Carolina